The men's high jump at the 2022 World Athletics Indoor Championships took place on 20 March 2022.

Results
The final was started at 10:45.

References

High jump
High jump at the World Athletics Indoor Championships